John Joe Joyce (born 17 October 1987) is an Irish amateur boxer who represented Ireland in the 2008 Olympic Games in the light welterweight division.

Joyce was born in Mullingar, County Westmeath. Joyce is a national Irish boxing champion who competed in the light welterweight and welterweight division. In the 2008 Olympic games he defeated Gyula Kate of Hungary by a score of 9–5, but lost via countback the round of 16 to eventual gold medallist Felix Diaz of the Dominican Republic in a match that was scored at a tie (11-11).

References

1987 births
Living people
Boxers at the 2008 Summer Olympics
Irish male boxers
Irish Traveller sportspeople
Light-welterweight boxers
Olympic boxers of Ireland
Sportspeople from County Westmeath